Tony Mateljan (born 18 February 1934) is an Australian cricketer. He played two first-class matches for Western Australia in 1959/60.

See also
 List of Western Australia first-class cricketers

References

External links
 

1934 births
Living people
Australian cricketers
Western Australia cricketers